The Ega long-tongued bat (Scleronycteris ega) is a bat species found in northwestern Brazil and southern Venezuela. It is monotypic within its genus.

References

Phyllostomidae
Bats of South America
Bats of Brazil
Mammals of Venezuela
Mammals described in 1912
Taxa named by Oldfield Thomas